is a Japanese footballer who plays as a midfielder for Nadeshiko League club Urawa Red Ladies and for the Japan women's national team.

References

1994 births
Living people
Japanese women's footballers
Women's association football midfielders
Urawa Red Diamonds Ladies players
Nadeshiko League players
Japan women's international footballers